Princess Dhasani Nonglaksana (complete title: Her Serene Highness Princess (Mom Chao) Dhasani Nonglaksana) is a Princess of Siam, a member of Siamese royal family, and a member House of Svastivatana, a royal house which originated by Her father and descends from Chakri Dynasty and half-sister of Queen Rambhai Barni of Siam.

References 

1889 births
1901 deaths
Dhasani Nonglaksana Svastivatana
Dhasani Nonglaksana Svastivatana
Dhasani Nonglaksana Svastivatana
19th-century Chakri dynasty
20th-century Chakri dynasty